Pavel Pampukha (born 26 June 1995) is a Belarusian professional footballer who plays for Niva Dolbizno.

References

External links 
 
 
 Profile at laczynaspilka.pl
 Profile at sports.ru

1995 births
Living people
Sportspeople from Brest, Belarus
Belarusian footballers
Association football forwards
Belarusian expatriate footballers
Expatriate footballers in Poland
FC Dynamo Brest players
FC Kobrin players
FC Baranovichi players
Sparta Brodnica players
FC Rukh Brest players